The Evolution Revo is an American ultralight trike, designed by Evolution Trikes of Zephyrhills, Florida. The aircraft is supplied as a complete ready-to-fly-aircraft.

The Revo was derived from the Hungarian Apollo Monsoon and is built under sub-contract in the United States by Powrachute of Middleville, Michigan. It was designed specifically to complete with the British Pegasus Quik.

Design and development
The Revo was designed to comply with the American light-sport aircraft category and has been accepted as an S-LSA.

The aircraft features a strut-braced hang glider-style high-wing, weight-shift controls, a two-seats-in-tandem open cockpit with a cockpit fairing, tricycle landing gear with wheel pants and a single engine in pusher configuration.

The Revo is made from welded steel tubing, with its double surface wing covered in Dacron sailcloth. Its  span North Wing Reflex wing has no kingpost and uses an "A" frame weight-shift control bar. The powerplant is a four-cylinder, air and liquid-cooled, four-stroke, dual-ignition  Rotax 912ULS engine or  Rotax 912UL.

A number of different wings can be fitted to the basic carriage, including the Reflex 11 and 13.

Specifications (Revo)

References

External links

2000s United States sport aircraft
2000s United States ultralight aircraft
Single-engined pusher aircraft
Ultralight trikes
Light-sport aircraft